Kamloops is a city in British Columbia, Canada.

Kamloops may also refer to:

Kamloops Lake, a lake along the Thompson River, British Columbia, Canada
Kamloops Indian Band or Tk’umlups Indian Band, a First Nations government within the Shuswap Nation Tribal Council, Canada
Kamloops (electoral district), a defunct federal electoral district in British Columbia, Canada
Kamloops (provincial electoral district), a provincial electoral district in British Columbia, Canada
SS Kamloops, a sunken lake freighter of Canada Steamship Lines
Kamloops Airport, an airport in British Columbia, Canada
Kamloops Water Aerodrome, an airport in British Columbia, Canada
Kamloops Heritage Railway, a railway in Kamloops, British Columbia, Canada
Kamloops rainbow trout, a variety of fish

See also